Saburo Murakami (村上三郎, Murakami Saburō, born June 27, 1925, in Kobe, died January 11, 1996 in Nishinomiya) was a Japanese visual and performance artist. He was a member of the Gutai Art Association and is best known for his paper-breaking performances (kami-yaburi) in which he burst through kraft paper stretched on large wooden frames. Paper-breaking is a canonical work in the history of Japanese post-war art and for the history of performance art. Murakami’s work includes paintings, three-dimensional objects and installation as well as performance, and is characterized by a highly conceptual approach that transcends dualistic thinking and materializes in playful interactive forms and often thematizes time, chance and intuition.

Biography 
Saburo Murakami was born in Kobe, Japan, in 1925, as the third son of an English teacher at Kwansei Gakuin Junior High School. He entered Kwansei Gakuin University in 1943, joined the university’s painting club Gengetsu-kai and began studying oil painting under Hiroshi Kanbara. After World War II, he resumed his studies, graduating from Kwansei Gakuin in 1948. In 1949, Murakami participated in the exhibitions of the art association Shinseisakuha kyōkai and began to study under painter Tsugurō Itō. In 1950, Murakami began working as an art teacher at an elementary school. He continued to teach art in elementary, middle and high schools, universities and kindergartens throughout his life. In 1951 he enrolled in aesthetics at Kwansei Gakuin’s graduate school. In the early 1950s, he participated in several group exhibitions, such as the exhibitions of the Shinseisaku Kyōkai (between 1949 and 1954) and the Ashiya City Exhibitions (from 1952 until his death). In 1952 Murakami formed the Zero-kai (Zero Group) with Kazuo Shiraga, Atsuko Tanaka, and Akira Kanayama, all fellows from the Shinseisaku Kyōkai. In 1953, he held his first two-person exhibitions with Yasuo Nakagawa and Kazuo Shiraga. In spring 1955, the Zero-kai members joined the Gutai Art Association, led by Jiro Yoshihara.

During his membership in Gutai from 1955 until 1972, Murakami presented his works mainly within Gutai projects, including the Outdoor Art Exhibitions at Ashiya Park in 1955 and 1956, the Gutai Art Exhibitions, the Gutai Art on the Stage shows in 1957 and 1958, the International Sky Festival in 1960, and Gutai’s participation in Expo ’70. Murakami’s first solo exhibition took place at the Gutai Pinacotheca in 1963. Murakami was also a fixture in the group’s international collaborations with French art critic Michel Tapié, art dealers Rodolphe Stadler in Paris and Martha Jackson in New York, and with the artist groups ZERO and Nul in Germany and the Netherlands. In 1960, Murakami was appointed the Japanese representative at the International Centre of Aesthetic Research Committee in Turin. In 1966, on behalf of Gutai, Murakami travelled to the Netherlands to facilitate the group’s participation in exhibitions with the Dutch and German artists groups Nul and ZERO. Murakami remained a Gutai member until 1972. Erudite in literature, aesthetics and philosophy, he was considered the “philosopher” among the Gutai members.[6]

Beginning in 1972, Murakami’s work increasingly included performance and interaction with the visitors of his exhibitions in galleries in Osaka and Kobe. Around 1975, Murakami became involved in the artist collaborative Artist Union (AU) formed by fellow Gutai artist Shōzō Shimamoto and organized exhibitions, symposiums and mail art projects. He continued to exhibit new works in group exhibitions such as the Ashiya City Exhibitions, but he also participated in an increasing number of exhibitions worldwide featuring Gutai. 

In 1990 he became a full professor of Kobe Shoin Women’s Junior College, where he had taught art since 1950. Murakami died in 1996 of a cerebral contusion. At that time, he was preparing his first retrospective at the Ashiya City Museum of Art & History.

Personal life 
In 1950 he married Makiko Yamaguchi. Their son Tomohiko Murakami, born in 1951, is a critic and researcher of manga and pop culture and has been a professor at Kobe Shoin Women’s University.  Murakami recounted that his paper-breaking was inspired by his toddler son, who in a tantrum burst through the fusuma paper space divider at their home.

Artwork 
Around 1953, Murakami gave up figurative painting and began making abstract paintings with surfaces that were structured in impastoed segments of oil paint. In the mid-1950s, he began to experiment with methods of applying paint, such as throwing a ball, which he had dipped into color, onto sheets of paper. Murakami's discovery of tearing paper and other surfaces as a method of artistic production marked a turning point in his approach to painting and provided the basis for his later performance works.

For the First Gutai Art Exhibition at Ohara Hall in Tokyo in 1955, Murakami stretched paper onto wooden frames, burst through the paper, and put the remaining ripped paper on display. The first version Muttsu no ana (6 Holes) from 1955 posed the question of what constitutes the actual artwork – the object, the performance or the photography. Murakami continued to perform the act of paper-breaking (kami-yaburi) throughout his entire life, varying in the number and quality of paper screens as well as in the structure.

For the Gutai group’s experimental projects like the Outdoor Art Exhibitions of 1955 and 1956, the Gutai Art Exhibitions between 1955 and 1971, and the Gutai Art on the Stage shows of 1957 and 1958, Murakami contributed interactive three-dimensional conceptual objects and performances of tearing paper. Examples include Hako (Box) (1956), a wooden box with a ticking and ringing clock inside, Kūki (Air) (1956), a box made of plexiglass that contained nothing but air, and Arayuru fūkei (All Landscapes) (1957), a simple wooden frame hanging from the branches of a tree. In 1957, Murakami created a number of paintings applying nikawa, an animal glue used in Nihonga painting, to the canvas, with the effect that the surface gradually peels off with time.

Between 1958 and 1963, when Gutai was working with the French art critic and advocate of Informel, Michel Tapié, Murakami created gestural abstract paintings with multiple layers of synthetic resin paint applied in dynamic rough movements and streaming down the surface. He experimented with varying the structures of surfaces by attaching wooden frames or molded plaster. From 1963 onward, Murakami adopted a new style in his paintings by reducing the number of colors of paint and simplifying the pictorial formal elements, by which he thematized the boundaries of painting.

As a further questioning of painting, in 1970, he stuck together the front sides of two canvasses so that only the backsides of the frames were visible and covered the structure with paint. In 1971, Murakami held a solo exhibition, during which wooden boxes were placed throughout the city of Osaka and then collected and dismantled in the gallery Mori’s Form. After this exhibition, Murakami submitted his resignation from Gutai, which was rejected by Yoshihara. After Gutai dissolved following Yoshihara’s death in 1972, Murakami’s exhibitions, which he held in galleries in Osaka and Kobe, increasingly centered around events of performance and interaction with the visitors. Painting and drawing often were part of these events, such as in the case of Suji (Lines) at Shinanobashi Gallery Apron in Osaka in 1974, during which Murakami’s work consisted in the act of drawing a line on sheets of paper with the arrival of each visitor. He also continued to create conceptual objects and installation artworks, which were shown in group exhibitions, e.g. the Ashiya City Exhibitions and projects by the Artists Union. From the 1980s onward Murakami recreated some of his works from the early Gutai years and performed paper-breaking for the increasing number of exhibitions worldwide that featured Gutai from a historical perspective.

Murakami was also a renowned painter, whose highly conceptual methods and presentation led to experimentation with a variety of painting gestures inspired by children. A central premise of his work was the playfulness of the creative act of painting.

Murakami’s art is characterized by a highly conceptual, relational and at the same time strongly intuitive approach that often materialized in seemingly simple works that bring into focus the effects and the experience of space and time, chance and intuition. Murakami’s paintings, three-dimensional objects and performances challenged preconceptions on painting, art and perception of the world at large, and are considered as important examples of performance and conceptual art in Japan.

Murakami's works are held in public and private collections all over the world, e.g. Ashiya City Museum of Art & History, Osaka City Museum of Modern Art, The National Museum of Modern Art, Kyoto, The National Museum of Art, Osaka, Chiba City Museum of Art, Museum of Contemporary Art, Tokyo, Hyōgo Prefectural Museum of Art, The Miyagi Museum of Art, Axel and May Vervoordt Foundation, Guggenheim Abu Dhabi, The Art Institute of Chicago, The George Economou Collection, the Museum of Modern Art, New York, Centre Georges Pompidou, Paris, M+, Hong Kong, Rachofsky Collection, Dallas.

Reception 
Reports on Gutai exhibitions in the Japanese press in the mid-1950s depicted Murakami’s performance of paper-breaking as an attention-seeking whimsical stunt by a proponent of a group of provocative young artists, rather than considering its deeper art-theoretical implications. Hako (Box) from 1956 was also described as provocative gag in the press.

With the international expansion of Gutai’s network in the late 1950s and early 1960s, paper-breaking, along other Gutai artists’ works, became part of the growing international discourse on action and performance art. Murakami’s three-dimensional objects and installation artworks were revalued in the context of the emergence of art movements in Europe and the US that experimented with approaches of installation, environment and conceptual art at the same time. In particular, through the striking photographs of 6 Holes (1955) and Passage (1956), the latter also documented by photographer Kiyoji Otsuji, paper-breaking became iconic for Gutai, post-war Japanese art and performance art.

A work painted by throwing a ball from 1954 has been acquired by the Museum of Modern Art, New York.

Until the 1990s, Murakami’s works were predominantly dealt with in the context of the art historical assessment of the Gutai group at large. His abstract paintings from about 1957 until the 1960s were thus considered as works from Gutai’s phase of regression from experimental interactive three-dimensional objects and performances towards conventional gestural abstract painting caused by the influence of Tapié. Since the 1990s, Murakami’s works, including his paintings from the 1960s and his performative exhibitions from the 1970s, have been increasingly reconsidered art historically and acknowledged.

Exhibitions (selection) 

 1952    5th Ashiya City Exhibition, Buddhist Hall, Ashiya
 1953    Two-person exhibition with Yasuo Nakagawa, Gallery Umeda, Osaka
 1953    Two-person exhibition with Shiraga Kazuo, Hankyū Department Store, Osaka
 1955    Experimental Outdoor Exhibition of Modern Art to Challenge the Midsummer Sun, Ashiya Park, Ashiya
 1955    First Gutai Art Exhibition, Ohara Hall, Tokyo
 1956    6th Kansai Art Exhibition, Osaka City Museum of Fine Arts
 1956    Shinkō Independent Exhibition, Shinkō shinbun newspaper, Kobe
 1956    9th Ashiya City Exhibition, Seidō Elementary School, Ashiya
 1956    Outdoor Gutai Art Exhibition, Ashiya Park, Ashiya
 1956    2nd Gutai Art Exhibition, Ohara Hall, Tokyo
 1957    3rd Gutai Art Exhibition, Kyoto Municipal Museum of Art
 1957    Gutai Art on the Stage, Sankei Hall, Osaka/ Sankei Hall, Tokyo
 1958    International Art of a New Era: Informel and Gutai, Takashimaya Department Store, Osaka, and four other cities in Japan
 1958    The Gutai Group Exhibition / 6th Gutai Art Exhibition, Martha Jackson Gallery, New York and four other American cities
 1959    8th Gutai Art Exhibition, Kyoto Municipal Museum of Art/ Ohara Hall, Tokyo
 1963    Solo exhibition, Gutai Pinacotheca, Osaka
 1964    14th Gutai Art Exhibition, Takashimaya Department Store, Osaka
 1965    15th Gutai Art Exhibition, Gutai Pinacotheca, Osaka
 1968    20th Gutai Art Exhibition, Gutai Pinacotheca, Osaka
 1971    Saburo Murakami Box (Hako) One-Man Show, Mori’s Form, Osaka
 1973    Murakami Saburo Solo Exhibition, Gallery Shunjūkan, Osaka
 1973    Murakami Saburo Exhibition, Mugensha, Osaka
 1974    Murakami Saburo Exhibition, Shinanobashi Gallery Apron, Osaka
 1975    Murakami Saburo Kakikuke solo show (Kakikuke koten), Gallery Seiwa, Osaka
 1976    Murakami Saburo Exhibition, Shinanobashi Gallery Apron, Osaka
 1977    Murakami Saburo Exhibition: Displeasure by the principle of identity (Jidōritsu no fukai), Galerie Kitano Circus, Kobe
 1979    Jirō Yoshihara and Today’s Aspects of the Gutai, Hyōgo Prefectural Museum of Modern Art, Kobe
 1983    Dada in Japan. Japanische Avantgarde 1920-1970. Eine Fotodokumentation, Kunstmuseum Düsseldorf
 1986    Group Gutai: Action and Painting / Grupo Gutai. Pintura y acción, Hyōgo Prefectural Museum of Modern Art, Kobe, Museo Español De Arte Contemporaneo, Madrid
 1986    Japon des avant-gardes 1910–1970, Musée National d’Art Moderne, Centre Georges Pompidou, Paris
 1990    Giappone all’avangardia: Il Gruppo Gutai negli anni cinquanta, Galleria Nazionale d’Arte Moderna, Rome
 1991    Gutai: Japanische Avantgarde / Gutai: Japanese Avant-Garde 1954–1965, Mathildenhöhe, Darmstadt
 1992    Gutai I: 1954–1958, Ashiya City Museum of Art & History, Kobe
 1993    Passaggio a Oriente, 45th Venice Biennale, Venice
 1993    Gutaï…suite?, Palais des arts, Toulouse
 1993    Gutai 1955/56: A Restarting Point for Japanese Contemporary Art, Penrose Institute of Contemporary Arts, Tokyo, Kirin Plaza, Osaka
 1993    MUSIC / every sound includes music, Xebec Foyer, Kobe
 1994    Japanese Art after 1945: Scream Against the Sky, Guggenheim Museum SoHo, New York and other venues
 1994    Hors limites: L’art et la vie 1952–1994, Centre Georges Pompidou, Paris
 1994    One Day Museum: Feeling from seeing, Kawanishi City Hall, Hyōgo
 1996    Saburo Murakami Exhibition, Ashiya City Museum of Art & History, Ashiya
 1998    Out of Actions: Between Performance and the Object 1949–1979, The Museum of Contemporary Art, Los Angeles; Museum of Contemporary Art, Tokyo, and other venues.
 1999    Gutaï, Galerie nationale du Jeu de Paume, Paris
 2001    Le tribù dell’arte, Galleria Comunale d’Arte Moderna e Contemporanea, Rome
 2004    Gutai Retrospective, Hyōgo Prefectural Museum of Art, Kobe
 2004    Traces: Body and Idea in Contemporary Art, The National Museum of Modern Art, Kyoto; The National Museum of Modern Art, Tokyo
 2006    ZERO: Internationale Künstler-Avantgarde der 50er/60er Jahre, Museum Kunst Palast, Düsseldorf/ Musée d’Art Moderne de Saint-Étienne
 2007    Artempo: Where Time Becomes Art, Palazzo Fortuny, Venice
 2009    Fare mondi, 53th Venice Bienniale, Venice
 2010    Gutai: Dipingere con il tempo e lo spazio / Gutai: Painting in Time and Space, Museo Cantonale d’Arte, Lugano, Parco Villa Ciani, Lugano
 2011    Saburo Murakami: Focus on the 70s, ARTCOURT Gallery, Osaka
 2012    Gutai: The Spirit of an Era, The National Art Center, Tokyo
 2012    Destroy the Picture: Painting the Void, 1949–1962, The Museum of Contemporary Art, Los Angeles/ The Museum of Contemporary Art, Chicago
 2012    TOKYO 1955–1970: A New Avant-Garde, The Museum of Modern Art, New York
 2013    Parallel Views: Italian and Japanese Art from the 1950s, 60s, and 70s, The Warehouse, Rachofsky Collection, Dallas
 2013    Gutai: Splendid Playground, Solomon R. Guggenheim Museum, New York
 2014    Saburo Murakami, ARTCOURT Gallery, Osaka
 2016    Performing for the Camera, Tate Modern, London
 2016    The Emergence of Contemporary: Avant-Garde Art in Japan, 1950–1970, Paço Imperial, Rio de Janeiro
 2016    A Feverish Era: Art Informel and the Expansion of Japanese Artistic Expression in the 1950s and ’60s, The National Museum of Modern Art, Kyoto, Palais de Beaux-Arts, Brussels
 2017    Japanese Art of the 1950s: Starting Point after the War, The Museum of Modern Art, Hayama
 2017    Saburo Murakami, ARTCOURTGallery, Osaka
 2017    Saburo Murakami, Axel Vervoordt Gallery, Wijnegem
 2018    Gutai 1953–59, Fergus McCaffrey, New York
 2018    Gutai, L’espace et le temps, Musée Soulages, Rodez
 2019    The Yamamura Collection: Gutai and the Japanese Avant-Garde 1950s–1980s, Hyogo Prefectural Museum of Art, Kobe

Further reading 

 具体資料集 Gutai shiryōshū / Gutai Documents 1954–1972, ed. by the Ashiya City Museum of Art & History, Ashiya: Ashiya City Museum of Art & History, 1994.
村上三郎展 Murakami Saburō ten / Saburo Murakami Exhibition, exhいb. cat., Ashiya: Ashiya City Museum of Art & History, 1996.
Tatsunori Sakaide, ビターズ２滴半 : 村上三郎はかく語りき Bitāzu 2-tekihan: Murakami Saburō wa kaku katariki / Two and a Half Drops of Bitters: Extraordinary Tales of Murakami Saburo, Osaka: Seseragi Shuppan, 2012.
Murakami Saburō: Through the '70s, Osaka: ARTCOURT Gallery, 2013.
Gutai: Splendid Playground, exh. cat., New York: The Solomon R. Guggenheim Museum, 2013.

External links 

 Chronology and list of exhibitions, ARTCOURT Gallery, Osaka

References 

1925 births
1996 deaths
Japanese performance artists
Japanese contemporary artists
People from Kobe
Kwansei Gakuin University alumni